Club Atlético Santa Rosa, known simply as Atlético Santa Rosa, is an Argentine football club based in Santa Rosa, La Pampa. The team currently plays in the Liga Cultural de Fútbol de La Pampa, a regional league of Argentina, where has won 10 titles to date.

In 1983, Atlético Santa Rosa qualified to play in the 1983 Campeonato Nacional of the Argentine Primera División. However, the team was eliminated after losing all six of their games. With this being its only season in the Argentine topflight, Atlético is positioned last in the All-time Argentine Primera División table, with 6 games lost (all the ones it played), 4 goals for and 24 against (−20 of goal difference).

Titles
Liga Cultural de Fútbol de La Pampa: 10
 1951, 1956, 1960, 1975, 1982, 1992, 1993, 1999, 2003, 2010
Torneo Regional Patagónico: 1
 1983

References

External links
Official website 
Atlético fans site 
Liga Cultural de Fútbol de La Pampa 

Santa Rosa
Association football clubs established in 1923
1923 establishments in Argentina